Hellinsia haplistes is a moth of the family Pterophoridae. It is found in Indonesia (Java).

References

haplistes
Moths described in 1936
Moths of Indonesia
Endemic fauna of Indonesia
Fauna of Java